Roderic or Roderick O'Connor may refer to:

Roderic O'Conor (1860–1940), Irish painter
Roderic O'Connor (land commissioner) (1784–1860), Irish-Australian businessman and official
Roderic O'Connor (painter) (1907-2001), American painter
Roderic L. O'Connor (1921–1982), U.S. Assistant Secretary of State
Ruaidrí Ua Conchobair (c.1116–1198), (anglicised as Roderic O'Connor), High King of Ireland
Ruaidrí na Saide Buide (died 1118), (anglicised as Roderic O'Connor), king of Connacht
Roderic O'Connor (horse) (born 2008), racehorse
Roderick O'Connor (politician) (1910–2000), Northern Irish nationalist politician

See also
Rod O'Connor (disambiguation)

Oconnor, Roderic